In property and land use planning, amenity (lat. amoenitās “pleasantness, delightfulness”) is something considered to benefit a location, contribute to its enjoyment, and thereby increase its value. 

Tangible amenities can include the number and nature of guest rooms and the provision of facilities such as elevators (lifts), internet access, restaurants, parks, community centres, swimming pools, golf courses, health club facilities, party rooms, theater or media rooms, bike paths or garages. 

Intangible amenities include well-integrated public transport, pleasant views, nearby activities, and a low crime rate. Within the context of environmental economics, an environmental amenity can include access to clean air or clean water, or the quality of any other environmental good that may reduce adverse health effects for residents or increase their economic welfare.

Residential real estate can benefit from amenities which, in turn, boost the property's value. Some examples of valuable amenities are proximity to parks and schools, updated fixtures, and bonus living spaces. These additional features that make a home desirable can add substantial value to a property.

Public amenities 

 Banks and post offices
 Cheap and easy access to utilities such as electricity, water, natural gas and internet
 General and specialized shops and markets
 Hospitals, clinics, and other medical facilities
 Libraries
 Local buses and railway stations and airports and ferry terminals
 Play schools and schools, colleges and universities
 Parks, beaches and public areas
 Roads with easy access to highways

Mobile amenities 
Mobile amenities may visit some sites including:
 Food truck
 Auto washing and detail service
 Oil Change
 Fuel Service
 Retail Sales Vehicle
 Mobile Repair Truck (Bike Repair, Golf Clubs)
 Mobile Hair / Nail Salon
 Mobile Dentist
 Mobile Maid

References 

Real estate
Public services
Social institutions